Kuzma Minin was a bulk carrier, registered in Murmansk, Russia. The bulk carrier delivered cargo around northern Europe, and visits ports such as Arkhangelsk, Gdańsk, Riga and Port Talbot. The name is given to commemorate Kuzma Minin, a hero of Russian resistance during the Time of Troubles.

Description
The ship was registered in Murmansk and was operated by the Murmansk Shipping Company.

Grounding
On 18 December 2018 the ship ran aground off Gyllyngvase beach, Falmouth, Cornwall, but was re-floated the same day.

Fate
The ship was scrapped at Aliaga  on 3 June 2020.

References

External links
 Video of the ship from 2013 or earlier

1980 ships
Bulk carriers
Maritime incidents in 2018
Cargo ships of Russia
Murmansk Shipping Company